Ida Noyes Hall is a three-story, Neo-Gothic building located on the University of Chicago campus in Chicago, Illinois. Designed by Shepley, Rutan and Coolidge and completed in 1916, the building features fireplaces, a limestone exterior, intricately plastered ceilings, and elaborate wood paneling.

History
Ida Noyes Hall originally served as a women's clubhouse and gymnasium, and was built as a complement to the Reynolds Club and Hutchinson Commons, which provided social and recreational spaces for the men on campus. The construction of the building was made possible by a gift from La Verne Noyes in the memory of his late wife, Ida. Ida Noyes, née Smith, was born in Croton, N.Y., in 1853, though her family relocated to Iowa in 1857. She graduated from Iowa State University with a degree in teaching in 1874 and married La Verne Noyes in 1877. Upon its opening, Ida Noyes Hall hosted public lectures, club meetings, and social events.

In January 2005 a portrait of Ida Noyes, painted by Oliver Dennett Grover and donated to the building by La Verne Noyes, was stolen from the building.

Renovations

In 1987, the gymnasium was converted into Max Palevsky Cinema. Since that time, Doc Films has screened movies every night of the academic year. In 1995, the murals on the third floor, originally created in 1918 to commemorate the quarter centennial of the University of Chicago and the opening of Ida Noyes Hall, were restored. In 2007, the building underwent repairs to address a crumbling facade and leaking roof, and in 2008, the University's Booth School of Business renovated the natatorium to create additional study space for student study groups.

Currently, Ida Noyes Hall hosts student events, academic department events, corporate recruiting sessions, and private parties. It is home to the University of Chicago Pub and the Office of Career Advancement.

Notable events
Opening celebration and quarter centennial of the University of Chicago (1916)
Wedding reception of John D. Rockefeller IV and Sharon Percy Rockefeller (1967)
Used as a filming location for The Express: The Ernie Davis Story (2007)
The Chicago Hearing (2010)
Traditionally, the final day of the University of Chicago Scavenger Hunt takes place in Ida Noyes Hall (annually)

See also
Gothic Revival architecture
University of Chicago

References

External links
Ida Noyes Hall Website

University of Chicago
Buildings and structures in Chicago
Gothic Revival architecture in Illinois
Buildings and structures completed in 1916